Little Gerhard, (born Karl-Gerhard Lundkvist, 17 May 1934) is a Swedish singer and rock musician. He had big music hits between 1958 and the mid-60s, with songs like "Buona Sera", "What You've Done to Me" and "Den siste mohikanen".

Biography
In his early years he boarded a ship and became a sailor, he made his stage debut in 1952 in Amsterdam, the Netherlands at the nightclub "Trocadero". At that time he played guitar and the accordion. After ending his career as a sailor he moved to Stockholm, where he entered several amateur singing competitions and he later saw success as a rock musician His first music group was called Halen, which he performed with at New Year's Eve 1957. Via this concert he signed with the record label Karusell. He released his first music albm in 1958 called "Little Gerhard", the song "What You've Done To Me" became his first hit. Already in March of the same year he was named "Sweden's rock music king" and in August that year he also was named "The rock music king of the Nordics". He made his film debut in the 1958 film Det svänger på slottet-

His third music album became at its release in 1958 the best selling music album within Swedish rocknroll during the 1950s, and Little Gerhards Gold certified record. His band The G-men went on a summer tour in 1959 and the next coming five years. In 1961, he started to sing in Swedish his native tongue, now under the artist name Little Gerhard for the first time. His song "Blommor och Bin" charted on the Svensktoppen list. he also did recordings in West Germany and sang in German. By the late 1960, he focused on his career as a  songwriter and producer. He participated in Melodifestivalen 1982 broadcast on SVT with the song "Hand i hand med dig" in a duet with singer Yvonne Olsson.

Filmography
1958 - Det svänger på slottet
1958 - Åsa-Nisse in Military Uniform

References

External links

Living people
1934 births